Aganippe may refer to:
 Aganippe, several figures in Greek mythology
 Aganippe (spider), a spider genus in the family Idiopidae
 Aganippe Fossa, a surface feature on Mars
 Delias aganippe, the wood white, a butterfly species endemic to Australia